This is a list of the Lords, Barons and Marquisses of Baux.

List of rulers of Baux

Lords of Baux of the House of Baux

Pons the Younger (born), father of
Hugh I (born after 1059), father of
  or "Guilhem Uc" (after 10301105), father of
Raymond I (before 10951150), father of
Hugh II (reigned 11501167; retired to Sardinia where he died in 1179)
Betrand I (1167–1181), brother of Hugh II
Hugh III (1181–1240), lord of Baux, viscount of Marseille, eldest son of Bertrand I
Barral of Baux (Barral I, 1240–1268), father of
Bertrand III (1268–1305), father of
Raymond II (1305–1322), father of
Hugh IV (1322–1351), father of
Robert (1351–1353)
Raymond III (1353–1372), brother of Robert, father of
John I (1372–1375)
Alice I (1372–1426), sister of John

This branch of the House of Baux was declared extinct in 1426.  The domains were inherited by Counts of Provence. The House of Baux moved to Italy on 1263 following Charles I of Anjou (see del Balzo).

Lords of Baux of the House of Valois-Anjou

 René I (1426–1480), also king of Naples as René I of Naples
 Charles I (Charles IV, Duke of Anjou 1480–1482),  son of

In 1482 the domains became part of the royal domain and the title passed to the French kings.

Lords of Baux of the House of Valois

 Louis I (1482–1483), also king of France as Louis XI of France
 Charles II (1483–1498), also king as Charles VIII of France
 Louis II (1498–1513), also king as Louis XII of France
 Francis I (1515–1547), also king as Francis I of France
 Henry I (1547–1559), also king as Henry II of France
 Francis II (1559–1560), also king as Francis II of France
 Charles III (1560–1574), also king as Charles IX of France
 Henry II (1574–1589), also king as Henry III of France

Lords of Baux of the House of Bourbon

 
 Henry III (1589–1610), also king of France and Navarre as Henry IV of France
 Louis III (1610–1643), also king of France and Navarre as Louis XIII of France

In 1513 Louis XII makes the Lordship of Baux into a Barony, which is ruled by a governor, who bears the title of baron.

From 1528 the Baron receives local assistance in the day-to-day governance of the Barony from a Captain-Visor.

Barons of Baux

 Bernardin of Baux (1513–1528)
 Anne de Montmorency (1528–1567)
 Honoré of Martins (1567–1582)
 James of Bauche (1582–1621)
 Anthony of Villeneuve (1621–1631)

After the death of Anne in 1567, the Captain-Visors become the strongmen of the Barony.

Captains-Visors of Baux

 Claude of Manville (1528-before 1553), his functions being assumed by his widow until 1553
 Pierre of Cotheron (1553–1560)
 John of Manville (1560–1562)
 John of Quiqueran-Ventabren (1562–1563)
 Gauchier of Quiqueran (1563–1564)
 Valentin of Grille (1564–1575)
 Peter of Véran (1575–1607)
 Peter of Savournin (1607–1618)
 Jack of Vérassy (1618–1631)

In 1631, the royal domain is sold by the king to the loyal community of Les Baux-de-Provence.  In 1642 the king donates the title of Marquis of Baux to prince Antonio I of Monaco.

Marquesses of Baux of the House of Grimaldi

 Ercole
 Anthony I
 Honoré I
 Honoré II
 Honoré III
 Florestan I until 1841
 Charles 1841 - 1856
 Albert I, 1856–1889
 Louis, 1889–1922
 Charlotte, 1922–1944
 Rainier, 1944–1958
 Albert II, 1958–2014
 Jacques, 2014–present

Marquis of Baux is nowadays one of the Prince of Monaco's many hereditary titles, and one which is usually also given to the reigning Prince's eldest son.

With the exception of Princess Charlotte, styled as Her HSH The Princess Charlotte, the Marquis of Baux is officially styled as HSH Hereditary Prince of Monaco or HSH Hereditary Princess of Monaco during their period as marquis or marquise.

Lords of Berre, Meyragues, Puyricard and Marignane branch 

 Bertrand II, second oldest son of Bertrand I of Baux, lord of Berre, Meyragues and Puyricard, and Marignane  (1181–1201)
 ...

From this branch originated the family branches of the Lords of Berre, Lords of Meyrargues and Puyricard, who became extinct in 1349, and lords of Marignane, acquired by House of Valois-Anjou, as well as the Dukes of Andria.

Princes of Orange of the House of Baux-Orange 

 Bertrand I of Baux (1171–1181)
 William I, count of Orange, youngest son of Bertrand I of Baux (1181–1218)
 Raymond I (1218–1282)
 Bertrand II (1281–1314)
 Raymond II (1314–1340)
 Raymond III (1340–1393)
 Mary of Baux-Orange (1393–1417), daughter, married John III of Châlon-Arlay

In 1417, the House of Châlon-Arlay, a cadet branch of the House of Ivrea succeeded as princes of Orange.

A brother of William I started the branch of the Lords of Courbezon (House of Baux-Courbezon), which became extinct in 1393.  Another brother started the line of Lords of Suze, Solerieux and Barri (House of Baux-Suze-Solerieux-Barri), which became extinct and reverted afterwards to the counts of Orange.

See also 
 Les Baux-de-Provence
 Les Baux de Provence AOC
 Baussenque Wars (1144–1162)
 Il signore di Baux

External links 
 MedLands genealogy of the des Baux family

Bouches-du-Rhône
Baux